The Nord 2800 was a 1950s training monoplane designed and built in France by Nord Aviation.

Development
The Nord 2800 was built in response to a French Air Force requirement for a military trainer to seat three people. It was a basic trainer design of all-metal construction that featured a retractable tail wheel type landing gear. Competitors to the Nord 2800 included the Dassault MD-80 ABC and Morane-Saulnier MS.730. The Nord 2800 had two of the crew sitting side-by-side, with the third crewman sitting behind. Flight tests revealed controllability issues, and despite tail and rudder modifications, the Nord 2800 lost out to the MS.730.

Specifications (variant specified)

References

 

1950s French civil utility aircraft
2800
Single-engined tractor aircraft
Low-wing aircraft
Aircraft first flown in 1950